Sărata Nouă is a commune in Leova District, Moldova. It is composed of two villages: Sărata Nouă and Bulgărica.

References

Communes of Leova District